The Whittier Daily News is a paid local daily newspaper for Whittier, California, United States. Coverage area includes Whittier, South Whittier, Pico Rivera, La Habra Heights, Santa Fe Springs and La Mirada. The Whittier Daily News is a member of Southern California News Group (formerly the Los Angeles Newspaper Group), a division of Digital First Media. It is also part of the San Gabriel Valley Newspaper Group, along with the San Gabriel Valley Tribune and the Pasadena Star-News.

Thomson Newspapers purchased the paper in 1982. Thomson sold the Daily News to William Dean Singleton's MediaNews Group in 1996.

References

External links

Official website
Mobile website

Daily newspapers published in Greater Los Angeles
MediaNews Group publications
Whittier, California
Mass media in Los Angeles County, California
Digital First Media